Kalochori (Greek: Καλοχώρι, before 1926: Δοβρόλιτσα - Dovrolitsa; Macedonian Slavic: Добролишта (Dobrolišta), Bulgarian: Добролища, Добролишча in the Kostur dialect, is a small rural village, part of the municipal unit of Kastoria, Kastoria regional unit, Greece.  Kalochori is also located 14 kilometers away from the city of Kastoria and 14 kilometers away from the village of Nestorio. It was a part of the former municipal unit of Mesopotamia. The village has an elevation of 721 meters above sea level.

History

Ottoman Empire
According to Academician Ivan Duridanov, the etymology of the name is from the original patronymic of ishti, which comes from the personal name Dobrol 

In the fifteenth century, the village had 140 names of households that were named.

Families from Dobrolishta, along with Slimnitsa and Omotsko, settled in 1791 and in the Nevrokop village of Kovachevitsa, where they formed the so-called Arnautska neighborhood. They are engaged in construction and founded the Kovachevitsa architectural-building school.

In the beginning of the 20th century, the entire Christian population of Dobrolishta was under the influence of the Patriarchate of Constantinople, but after the Ilinden uprising in the beginning of 1904 it was under the influence of the Bulgarian Exarchate.

The same year, Ottoman authorities did not allow teacher A. Naumov from Aposkep to open a Bulgarian school in the village.

In October 1906, Ottoman forces succeeded in killing the voivode Nikola Dobrolitski and two of his chetniks in Dobrolishta 

Also in 1906, Dobrolista was attacked by Greek forces lead by Nikolaos Platanias (Lahtaras).

Greece
At the outbreak of the Balkan Wars in 1912, two people from Dobrolishta were volunteers in the Macedonian-Adrianople Corps.

During the Balkan wars, the village was occupied by Greek troops and remained in Greece after the Balkan Wars.

Borivoje Milojevic, a Serbian geographer, wrote in his book Južna Makedonija (1921) that Dobrolishta had 30 Slavic Christian houses and 40 Turkish houses.

The Greek census (1920) recorded 434 people in the village and in 1923 there were 198 inhabitants (or 140 families) who were Muslim. Following the Greek-Turkish population exchange, in 1926 within Dovrolitsa there were 39 refugee families from Pontus. The Greek census (1928) recorded 455 village inhabitants. There were 40 refugee families (139 people) in 1928.

In 1926, Dobrolishta is changed to Kalohorion which translates to good village.

During the Second World War, Kalochori was in the Italian occupation zone and a subdivision of the Central Macedonian-Bulgarian Committee was established in Kalochori, headed by the Dobrolitski family. The village suffered from the Italian detachments.

On May 4, 1945 Kalochori was pillaged by the Greek detachment of Andonios Amanatidis, many women and men are abused. 13 children from Kalochori, are moved out of the country by the communist authorities as refugees to the Eastern Bloc during the Greek Civil War. There are nine political killings in the village during the Greek Civil War.

The village of Tsartsista was eventually abandoned around the 1970's and its inhabitants were relocated to Kalochori.

Kalochori typically produces tobacco, wheat, and lentils in its surrounding fields.

Historical figures 

Spiro Mirkovski, (Spiros Mirkopoulos), (1929-1949), - member of the Democratic Army of Greece.

Vangel Mirkovski, (Evangelos Mirkopoulos), (1915 - 1949), - Communist, officer of ELAS, high ranking member of DAG

Lazar Poplazarov- commander of an armed detachment of ELAS, editor of "Slavyanomakedonski Glas" newspaper, district leader of the SNLF, and general directorate member of the NLF.

Vasil Bruzho- a member of the IMRO

Vasil Hristovski, (Vasilis Xristopoulos), (1913- 8 August 1948) - partisan, member of SNLF and NLF

Zissos Deliovski, (Zisis Deliopoulos), (?- 1981) - Communist, and head of the Northeast Committee of Kastoria, died in 1981

Zissos Kalimanov, (Zisis Kallimanis), (? - 1943), - Communist, arrested in Akronavlia, released in June 1941, was killed by an Italian patrol in Pelekanos 

Ilia Tepov (1884 -?)- Macedonian-Odrin Opolechenitsa, Kosturska cheta.

Ilia Tolev (Tolyov) - Macedonian-Odrin Opolechenitsa, Kosturska cheta.

Petar Ivanov - Bulgarian revolutionary , member of the IMRO and Chetnik of Petar Xristov "Germancheto".

Mitre Kalimanov- Communist, brother of Pascal Kalimanov, during the Second World War leads a detachment of Ohrana, and then joins the SNLF

Nikola Dobrolitski (1876 - 30 October 1906)- IMRO revolutionary, grandfather of Yagnoula Kunovska 

Paskal Kalimanov, (Pasxalis Kalimanis), - one of the leaders of the Ohrana in the years of the Second World War, later joined SNLF and eventually emigrated to Skopje.

Tashko Georgiev - Bulgarian revolutionary , member of the IMRO and Chetnik of Petar Xristov "Germancheto".

Apostol Kalimanov, (Apostolos Kalimanis), - member of the Macedonian-Bulgarian committee.

Staso Chanakov Dobrolite - IMRO member 

Todor Vlahov, (Theodoros Vlahos), (1913 - 1946) - Communist, member of OKNE, CPG, and ELAS

Trpo Kalimanov, (Elefterios Kalimanis), (? - 1943)- Communist, member of the Communist Party of Greece

Todor Kalimanov - (Thodoros Kalimanis), - village leader 

Yagnoula Kunovska - (1943- )- a lawyer, politician, and artist in North Macedonia, granddaughter of Nikola Dobrolitski 

Sterjana Vangelova - (1924- ) - participant in the Greek Civil War

Sterjo Kalimanov - (Stergios Kalimanis), - member of Ohrana.

Censuses 
1913 - 468 people
1920 - 434 people
1928 - 455 people
1940 - 634 people
1951 - 585 people
1961 - 520 people
1971 - 458 people
1981 - 475 people
1991 - 459 people
2001- 458 people
2011 - 398 people

References

Populated places in Kastoria (regional unit)